Asociación Deportiva Ciudad de Guadalajara, also known as BM Guadalajara, is a Spanish handball team based in Guadalajara, that plays in the Liga ASOBAL.

History

The club was founded in 2007 and managed to get promoted to the first division in the Liga ASOBAL in just three seasons. After the 2020/21 First Division season, the club finished 15th and was relegated to the Second Division. After the 2021/22 season of the second division, the team was again promoted to the first division.

Crest, colours, supporters

Kit manufacturers

Kits

Sports Hall information

Name: – Palacio Multiusos de Guadalajara
City: – Guadalajara
Capacity: – 5894
Address: – Av. de El Vado, 13, 19005, Guadalajara, Spain

Management

Team

Current squad 

Squad for the 2022–23 season

Technical staff
 Head coach:  Juan Carlos Requena
 Assistant coach:  Ricardo Mateo
 Fitness coach:  Edu Espi
 Physiotherapist:  Ane Bilbao
 Club Doctor:  José Ángel Izquierdo Alises

Transfers

Transfers for the 2022–23 season

Joining 
  Denys Barros (CB) from  Handebol Clube Taubaté
  Miguel Llorens (LP) from  Valence Handball
  Francisco Oliveira Silva (LB) from  Vitória Setubal
  Enrique Calvo (RW) from  BM Villa de Aranda

Leaving 
  Juan Marmesat (RB) to  CB Soria
  Dario Petrovski (CB) to  Junior Fasano
  Kemal Hamzic (CB)
  Luis Aybar (LP)

Previous Squads

Season by season

EHF ranking

Former club members

Notable former players

  Mateo Garralda (2011–2012)
  José Javier Hombrados (2015–2021)
  Chema Márquez (2014–2020)
  Pablo Paredes (2018–2021)
  Iñaki Peciña (2014–2015)
  Javier García Rubio (2017–2018)
  Valero Rivera (2008–2009)
  Gastón Mouriño (2020–2021)
  Agustín Vidal (2010–2011, 2017–2018)
  César Almeida (2013–2015)
  Lucas Cândido (2016–2018)
  Fábio Chiuffa (2014–2016, 2022–)
  Alexandro Pozzer (2013–2016)
  Ales Abrao Silva (2013–2014, 2015–2016)
  Guilherme Valadão Gama (2013–2014)
  Alen Blažević (2011–2012)
  Saeid Barkhordari (2019–2020)
  Giacomo Savini (2020–2021)
  Kostadin Petrov (2019–2020)
  Paweł Niewrzawa (2018–2019)
  Draško Nenadić (2012–2013)
  Stanislav Demovič (2009-2011)

Former coaches

References

External links
 
 

Spanish handball clubs
Sports teams in Castilla–La Mancha
Liga ASOBAL teams
Handball clubs established in 2007
2007 establishments in Spain
Sport in Guadalajara, Spain